The Kusasi, Kusaasi, or the Kusaal people, are an ethnic group in northern Ghana and southern Burkina Faso. They speak the Kusaal language, which is a Gur language.

Festival
The Kusaasi celebrate the Samanpiid Festival. The festival is used to thank God for a bumper harvest during the farming season. The festival was first celebrated in 1987.

References

External links
 Kusaal, Ghana. Joshua Project. Page Last Modified: 28-May-2009.
 Ghana: Kusasi Opinion Leaders Attribute Recent Violence in Bawku to Armed Robbers. Baba Kofi Yaro, Public Agenda (Accra) 8 May 2009.
  The Peoples Of Northern Ghana. National Commission On Culture of the government of Ghana.
 Ethnicity in Ghana: the limits of invention. Carola Lentz, Paul Nugent Eds. Palgrave Macmillan, 2000  pp. 57–67

 
Ethnic groups in Burkina Faso
Ethnic groups in Ghana